Early Recordings is an album by Joan Osborne released on November 5, 1996.
Except for "His Eyes Are a Blue Million Miles," it consists of live recordings, mostly from Osborne's debut album, Soul Show: Live at Delta 88.

Track listing

Personnel
Ray Alfasi – photography
Chris Butler – guitar, producer
Yoomi Chong – design
Greg Di Gesu – assistant engineer
Dave Dreiwitz – guitar
Gary Frazier – bass
Tom Fritze – producer, engineer, mixing
Margery Greenspan – art direction
Amanda Homi – backing vocals
Wayne Isaak – photography
Mike Leslie – bass, dobro, backing vocals
George Marino – compilation
James Mussen – drums
Joan Osborne – tambourine, vocals, producer, engineer
Shawn Pelton – drums
Jack Petruzzelli – organ, acoustic guitar, guitar, backing vocals
Gary Schreiner – keyboards
Mark Shane – second engineer
Sissy Siero – backing vocals
Kevin Trainor – guitar
Nick Vaccaro – photography
Producer – Chris Butler (tracks: 3, 8), Joan Osborne, Tom Fritze (tracks: 1, 2, 4, 5, 7, 9 to 11)

References

Joan Osborne albums
1996 live albums
Mercury Records live albums